South Eastern Railway Colony (also known as BNR Colony) popularly known as BNR, is a locality in the Garden Reach neighbourhood of Kolkata city, the capital of the Indian state of West Bengal.

Transport
Garden Reach Road passes through BNR Colony. The road is connected to Karl Marx Sarani via Dumayne Avenue and Ram Surat Singh Road.

Private Bus
 1 Ramnagar - Mukundapur
 12 Badartala/Rajabagan - Esplanade/Rajabazar
 12A Badartala/Rajabagan - Howrah Station
 12C Pailan - Howrah Station
 227 BNR Colony - Bangur Avenue

Train
Khiddirpur railway station on the Kolkata Circular Railway line is the nearest railway station.

References

External links 
 Garden Reach Shipbuilders and Engineers

See also

Neighbourhoods in Kolkata
Railway Colonies in India